James "Fireball" Colzie (June 12, 1920 – March 23, 2010) was a Negro league baseball pitcher. He played mostly for the Indianapolis Clowns and the Atlanta Black Crackers.  He served in the United States Army during World War II. 

On July 20, 1947, the Clowns' team bus was struck by a car, resulting in Colzie dislocating his knee. Colzie sued the driver of the car and was awarded $4,000.

His son, Neal Colzie, was a National Football League player.

References

External links
 and Baseball-Reference Black Baseball stats and Seamheads
Negro League Baseball Players Association page

1920 births
2010 deaths
Indianapolis Clowns players
Atlanta Black Crackers players
Baseball pitchers
Baseball players from Georgia (U.S. state)
United States Army personnel of World War II
People from Montezuma, Georgia
Military personnel from Georgia (U.S. state)
African Americans in World War II
United States Army Air Forces personnel of World War II
21st-century African-American people
African-American United States Army personnel